This is an incomplete list of castles and châteaux in Belgium. The Dutch word kasteel and the French word château refer both to fortified defensive buildings (castles proper) and to stately aristocratic homes (châteaux, manor houses or country houses). As a result, it is common to see the name of both types of building translated into English as 'castle', which can sometimes be misleading. Combined with the complication that some aristocratic homes were once intended for defence, here they have not been separated into two groups, and most buildings of both types are labelled as 'castles' in this list. Many members of the old Belgian noble families still live in castles (see Belgian nobility).





Antwerp province

East Flanders

Flemish Brabant

Limburg province

West Flanders



Hainaut province

Liège province

Luxembourg province

Namur province

Walloon Brabant

Bibliography
Luc Fr. Genicot (dir.), Châteaux forts et châteaux-fermes, Vokaer, Brussels, 1975
Luc Fr. Genicot (dir.), Châteaux de plaisance, Vokaer, Brussels, 1977
Albert de Visscher (dir.), Les plus beaux châteaux de Belgique, Reader's Digest, Brussels, 1984
Philippe Farcy, 100 Châteaux de Belgique connus & méconnus, t. I, Aparté, Brussels, 2002
Philippe Farcy, 100 Châteaux de Belgique connus & méconnus, t. II, Aparté, Brussels, 2003
Philippe Farcy, 100 Châteaux de Belgique connus & méconnus, t. III, Aparté, Brussels, 2004
Philippe Farcy, 100 Châteaux de Belgique connus & méconnus, t. IV, Aparté, Brussels, 2005
François-Emmanuel de Wasseige, « L’évolution des châteaux belges au XXe siècle », in : Demeures Historiques et Jardins, n° 153-156, Brussels, 2007
François-Emmanuel de Wasseige, La route des châteaux, éd. Institut du Patrimoine wallon (coll. Itinéraires du patrimoine, 6), Namur, 2012

Notes

References

External link

Belgium
Castles
Belgium
Belgium
Castles